Lloccesa (possibly from Aymara) is a  mountain in the southern extensions of the Vilcanota mountain range in the Andes of Peru. It is situated in the Puno Region, Carabaya Province, Macusani District, and in the  Melgar Province, Nuñoa District.

References

Mountains of Puno Region
Mountains of Peru